Anania verbascalis is a species of moth of the family Crambidae. It is found in Europe.

The wingspan is 22–26 mm. The moth flies from June to August depending on the location.

The larvae feed on Teucrium scorodonia and Verbascum thapsus.

References

External links 

 Anania verbascalis at UKmoths
 Lepidoptera of Belgium
 Lepiforum.de
 waarneming.nl 

Pyraustinae
Moths described in 1775
Moths of Europe
Taxa named by Michael Denis
Taxa named by Ignaz Schiffermüller